The 2021 Muskogee shooting was a mass murder that occurred in Muskogee, Oklahoma, United States, on February 2, 2021, when a gunman opened fire at a house. The shooter killed six people—a man and five children—and a woman was seriously injured. Law enforcement responded to the residence at 1:30 a.m. CST. A male suspect was taken into custody after he was briefly pursued on foot by police officers, but a motive is yet undetermined and no other suspects are involved.

Incident 
At around 1:30 a.m., officers responded to reports of a shooting at the home where Javarion Lee and his family lived. There, they encountered an armed man.

Victims 
The deceased were Javarion Lee, 24 years old, and his five nieces and nephews, who ranged in age from one to nine years. They included the brother, nieces, and nephews of the shooter. The children's mother survived but suffered serious injuries, and she was airlifted to a local hospital.

Three other children at the house during the shooting were uninjured.

Accused 
The accused was identified by law enforcement as 25-year-old Jarron Deajon Pridgeon (born March 21, 1995), who lived occasionally with Lee and his family. Pridgeon was previously charged with assault and battery in 2019 after he threw concrete at a woman. He pleaded guilty and was placed on probation for three years. He was also ordered to undergo an evaluation by a state mental health expert to identify a potential cause for his actions. Court charges for the prosecution of the shooting included "possession of a firearm after a felony conviction," suggesting Pridgeon somehow acquired a weapon despite his criminal record.

Response 
Grief counseling was provided for students at local schools that some of the deceased children attended. Counseling was also offered to police officers who had responded to the scene. Mayor Marlon Coleman announced that he would sign a proclamation to establish March as "Community Care Month for First Responders" shortly after the shooting.

Clergy groups in Muskogee led an effort to establish a monetary fund to help support the mother of the child victims, and they were assisted by the mayor's office.

References 

2021 in Oklahoma
2021 mass shootings in the United States
Deaths by firearm in Oklahoma
February 2021 crimes in the United States
Mass shootings in Oklahoma
Mass shootings in the United States
Home shooting